Riversdale is a community in the Canadian province of Nova Scotia, located in the Region of Queens Municipality.

References
Riversdale on Destination Nova Scotia

Communities in the Region of Queens Municipality
General Service Areas in Nova Scotia